Mauritius competed at the 2022 World Games held in Birmingham, United States from 7 to 17 July 2022.

Competitors
The following is the list of number of competitors in the Games.

Ju-jitsu

Mauritius competed in ju-jitsu.

Muaythai

Mauritius competed in muaythai.

References

Nations at the 2022 World Games
2022
World Games